Wonder of the World is the second studio album from contemporary Christian rock band Rush of Fools. It was released on September 16, 2008 through Midas Records and debuted at No. 187 on the Billboard 200. The album's first single was the title track "Wonder of the World".

Background
Rush of Fools was in studio recording for the album earlier in the year, April and May 2008, completing the process mid-year. The album's title was announced by July 2008. It was produced by Scott Davis, Jason Ingram and Rusty Varenkamp, and mixed by Lee Bridges with Tom Laune.

The members of Rush of Fools considered the album to be different thematically than the lyrics of their self-titled debut Rush of Fools. The band's guitarist and co-writer Kevin Huguley said in an interview that, "on our first album, we focused a lot on our sin—our need for grace—and the second album still has parts where we talk about our struggles, but this album focuses on the joy we have in Christ".

Music and lyrics
Kevin Huguley self-described Rush of Fools as a "little worship band". The track "Never Far Away" is a love song dedicated to the band members' wives, and was written about the life of touring across the United States; "but they are never far away because of the love that God has given us for each other and [because] our marriage relationships are in our hearts."  A remix for "Never Far Away" was produced by Jim Brickman and was made for Adult Contemporary stations, which became very popular. The song peaked at No. 11 on the Billboard Adult Contemporary chart in 2009.

Release and reception
Wonder of the World was released on September 16, 2008 and received moderate commercial success following the band's debut release Rush of Fools. It charted at No. 187 on the Billboard 200 in its first few weeks of release.

Critical reception of the album was somewhat mixed, however. Gospel Music Channel's review noted that, since Rush of Fools is a band based on the Christian worship genre, there is a "higher bar to vault over".

Track listing
Wonder of the World contains 11 main tracks, one bonus track which is Jamie’s rap song as the hidden track. And  another track that contains 29 seconds of silence.

All songs written by Jason Ingram, Kevin Huguley and Wes Willis, except where noted.
"There Is Nothing" - 3:19
"Wonder of the World" - 3:47
"Holy One" - 3:40
"You Are Glory" - 3:00
"Lose It All" - 3:10
"Escape" - 3:17
"The Only Thing That's Beautiful in Me" - 3:41
"Freedom Begins Here" - 3:38
"Tonight" - 3:48
"No Name" (Huguley, Willis, Scott Davis - 3:26
"Never Far Away" - 3:46
<dead air> - 0:29
"Jamie's Rap Song" (Jamie Sharpe) - 1:44

Personnel 
Rush of Fools
 Wes Willis – lead vocals, backing vocals, guitars 
 Kevin Huguley – guitars, backing vocals 
 J.D. Frazier – guitars, backing vocals (5)
 Jacob Chesnut – bass, backing vocals (5)
 Jamie Sharpe – drums, backing vocals (5)

Additional musicians
 Jeremy Bose – programming 
 Jason Ingram – programming, backing vocals 
 Rusty Varenkamp – programming
 Scotty D – programming (10)
 Adam Lester – guitars 
 Chris Carmichael – strings

Production
 Kevin Huguley – executive producer
 Andrew Patton – executive producer 
 Wes Willis – executive producer 
 Jason Ingram – producer (1-9, 11, 12, 13)
 Rusty Varenkamp – producer (1-9, 11, 12, 13), recording (1-9, 11, 12,13), editing (1-9, 11, 12, 13)
 Scotty D – producer (10), engineer (10), editing (10)
 Ben Phillips – engineer (10), editing (10)
 Tom Laune – mixing (1, 4, 7, 8, 9)
 F. Reid Shippen – mixing (2, 3)
 Lee Bridges – mixing (5, 6, 11)
 David Zaffiro – mixing (10), additional editing (10)
 Andrew Mendelson – mastering at Georgetown Masters, Nashville, Tennessee
 Boyhowdy – album design 
 Bo Streeter – photography

References

2008 albums
Rush of Fools albums
Midas Records Nashville albums